Leonid Grigorievich Kolotilo (born December 16, 1958, Leningrad) is a Soviet and Russian geographer, researcher of Lake Baikal, a full member of Academic Senate Russian Geographical Society, Captain 3rd Rank (1989).

Author of over 100 scientific publications.

References

External links 
 Учёный совет Русского географического общества
 Авторы-дарители Российской национальной библиотеки 
 Проект INTAS: Новая батиметрическая карта озера Байкал
 Прогулка по байкальскому дну
 Диссертации. Библиотека РГБ

1958 births
Living people
Russian geographers
Russian cartographers
Explorers of Siberia
Soviet male fencers